Mick Antoniw (born 1 September 1954) is a Welsh Labour and Co-operative politician, serving as Counsel General for Wales since 2021, and previously from 2016 to 2017. He has been the Member of the Senedd (MS) for Pontypridd since 2011.

Early life
Antoniw comes from a Ukrainian family, with a Danish mother and came to the UK as a result of his father seeking refugee status in the UK following World War II.

Antoniw came to Wales to study law at the Cardiff Law School in 1973. He was President of the National Union of Students Wales from 1977 to 1979.

Professional career
He was a practising solicitor before his election to the Senedd, specialising in personal injury. Antoniw was a partner in Thompsons Solicitors, the specialist trade union solicitors, with whom he began his training in 1980. He is a trustee of the Welsh Refugee Council.

Personal life
Antoniw fostered dozens of other people's children in the 15 years prior to his election, saying "When you are fostering, it brings immense quality. It is very challenging – and can be dependent on the nature of the fostering, whether the child is disabled or older children where there are difficulties. But my experience in the mixture of fostering that we did, was that it does add value to your life. Seeing children developing and beginning to blossom to some extent during the fostering process is very rewarding."

Political career
Antoniw was a leading member of the Wales Anti-apartheid Movement (WAAM) during the 1980s. In 1981 he was elected as a Labour councilor to the South Glamorgan County Council for the Court ward, gaining the seat from the Conservatives. He was re-elected in 1985 but did not seek re-election in 1989. 

At the 2011 Welsh Assembly election, Antoniw increased the Labour vote with a swing of 18.8%. His 11,864 votes amounted to over 50% of the poll; his majority over the second-placed Welsh Liberal Democrats candidate, Mike Powell, was 7,694. At the 2016 Welsh Assembly election Antoniw's vote fell to 9,986 and his majority was reduced.

He was appointed as Counsel General for Wales in June 2016. However, he departed from this role in November 2017 as part of a Government reshuffle, being replaced by Jeremy Miles.

Antoniw is a fluent Ukrainian speaker and has used his knowledge of the language when meeting with Ukrainian officials including deputy prime minister Volodymyr Groysman at international summits, such as the European Union Committee of the Regions. He has stated that he is a supporter of Ukrainian accession to the European Union, a supporter of the country joining NATO, and does not support Ukrainian federalism.  Antoniw visited Ukraine just prior to the 2022 Russian invasion of Ukraine alongside Plaid Cymru leader Adam Price in order to "show solidarity with workers and minorities" as they met workers, LGBTQ+ people, ethnic minorities and human rights defenders

A self-described socialist, Antoniw endorsed Jeremy Corbyn's 2015 campaign for the leadership of the Labour Party, Mark Drakeford's 2018 Welsh Labour leadership bid, and Keir Starmer's candidacy in the 2020 Labour leadership election. In January 2019 Drakeford appointed Antoniw as Welsh representative on the party's National Executive Committee: however, Antoniw and Drakeford subsequently successfully campaigned for the position to be democratically elected by the Welsh Labour membership. Antoniw ran in the first election for the post in 2020, receiving endorsements from several trade unions including Unison, as well as Momentum, the Labour Representation Committee and the Campaign for Labour Party Democracy: however, he was defeated by former First Minister of Wales Carwyn Jones, who won 5,195 votes to Antoniw's 4,933.

Honours and awards 
 :
 2019: Third Class of the Order of Merit of Ukraine

References

External links

 Official website

1954 births
Living people
People from Llantrisant
Labour Co-operative members of the Senedd
Members of South Glamorgan County Council
Wales AMs 2011–2016
Wales MSs 2016–2021
Wales MSs 2021–2026
Welsh solicitors
Welsh humanists
Welsh Christians
British people of Danish descent
British people of Ukrainian descent
Ukrainian emigrants to the United Kingdom
Alumni of Cardiff University
Recipients of the Order of Merit (Ukraine), 3rd class
20th-century Welsh lawyers
21st-century Welsh lawyers
20th-century Welsh politicians
21st-century Welsh politicians